Wank'a Ukru Punta (Quechua wank'a rock, ukru hole, pit, hollow, punta peak; ridge; first, before, in front of, "red mountain", also spelled Huancaucro Punta) is a  mountain in the Andes of Peru. It is located in the Huánuco Region, Dos de Mayo Province, Marías District. Wank'a Ukru Punta lies northwest of Tikti Punta and north of a lake named Saqsaqucha ("multi-colored lake").

References

Mountains of Peru
Mountains of Huánuco Region